This is a list of brand name breads.

Brand name breads

 Allinson 
 Alvarado Street Bakery
 Bimbo Bakeries USA – Arnold, Ball Park, Beefsteak, Bimbo, Brownberry, EarthGrains, Entenmann's, Eureka! Baking Company, Francisco, Freihofer's, Grandma Sycamore’s Homemade Bread, J.J. Nissen, Mrs. Baird's, Old Country, Oroweat, Sara Lee, Stroehmann's, Thomas', Tía Rosa, Weber's
 Bond Bread
 Bost's Bread 
 Boudin Bakery
 Dave's Killer Bread
 Davidovich Bagels
 Flowers Foods
 Franz Bread
 Holsum Bread 
 Hovis
 King's Hawaiian
 Kingsmill
 Lender's Bagels 
 Merita Breads 
 Nature's Pride 
 Pepperidge Farm 
 Polarbröd 
 Schmidt Baking Company
 Schwebel's Bakery 
 Sunbeam Bread 
 VitBe 
 Warburtons 
 Wonder Bread

See also

 Brand name
 List of baked goods
 List of bakeries
 List of breads
 List of food companies

References

 
Breads